In particle physics, a generation or family is a division of the elementary particles. Between generations, particles differ by their flavour quantum number and mass, but their electric and strong interactions are identical.

There are three generations according to the Standard Model of particle physics. Each generation contains two types of leptons and two types of quarks. The two leptons may be classified into one with electric charge −1 (electron-like) and neutral (neutrino); the two quarks may be classified into one with charge − (down-type) and one with charge + (up-type). The basic features of quark-lepton generation or families, such as their masses and mixings etc., can be described by some of the proposed family symmetries.

Overview
Each member of a higher generation has greater mass than the corresponding particle of the previous generation, with the possible exception of the neutrinos (whose small but non-zero masses have not been accurately determined). This mass hierarchy
causes particles of higher generations to decay to the first generation, which explains why everyday matter (atoms) is made of particles from the first generation only. Electrons surround a nucleus made of protons and neutrons, which contain up and down quarks. The second and third generations of charged particles do not occur in normal matter and are only seen in extremely high-energy environments such as cosmic rays or particle accelerators. The term generation was first introduced by Haim Harari in Les Houches Summer School, 1976.

Neutrinos of all generations stream throughout the universe but rarely interact with other matter.
It is hoped that a comprehensive understanding of the relationship between the generations of the leptons may eventually explain the ratio of masses of the fundamental particles, and shed further light on the nature of mass generally, from a quantum perspective.

Fourth generation
Fourth and further generations are considered unlikely by many (but not all) theoretical physicists.  Some arguments against the possibility of a fourth generation are based on the subtle modifications of precision electroweak observables that extra generations would induce; such modifications are strongly disfavored by measurements. Furthermore, a fourth generation with a 'light' neutrino (one with a mass less than about ) has been ruled out by measurements of the decay widths of the Z boson at CERN's Large Electron–Positron Collider (LEP).
Nonetheless, searches at high-energy colliders for particles from a fourth generation continue, but as yet no evidence has been observed.
In such searches, fourth-generation particles are denoted by the same symbols as third-generation ones with an added prime (e.g. b′ and t′).

The lower bound for a fourth generation of quark (b′, t′) masses is currently at 1.4 TeV from experiments at the LHC.

The lower bound for a fourth generation neutrino mass is currently at about 60 GeV (millions of times larger than the upper bound for the other 3 neutrino masses).

The lower bound for a fourth generation charged lepton mass is currently 100GeV and proposed upper bound of 1.2 TeV from unitarity considerations.

If the Koide formula continues to hold, the masses of the fourth generation charged lepton would be 44 GeV (ruled out) and b′ and t′ should be 3.6 TeV and 84 TeV respectively. (The maximum possible energy for protons in the LHC is about 6 TeV.)

Origin

The origin of multiple generations of fermions, and the particular count of 3, is an unsolved problem of physics.  String theory provides a cause for multiple generations, but the particular number depends on the details of the compactification of the D-brane intersections. Additionally, E grand unified theories in 10 dimensions compactified on certain orbifolds down to 4‑D naturally contain 3 generations of matter.
This includes many heterotic string theory models.

See also
 Grand Unified Theory
 Koide formula
 Neutrino mass hierarchy

References

Quarks